Marlon Matheus da Silva (born 24 March 1994), known as Marlinho, is a Brazilian professional footballer who plays as a midfielder for Madureira.

Career

Club
On 17 August 2015, Marlinho moved to Norwegian Tippeligaen side Aalesunds FK on loan for the remainder of the 2015 season. Following the conclusion of the 2015 season, on 15 December 2015, Marlinho signed a three-year contract with Aalesunds.

Career statistics

Club

References

1994 births
People from Duque de Caxias, Rio de Janeiro
Sportspeople from Rio de Janeiro (state)
Living people
Brazilian footballers
Association football midfielders
Esporte Clube Tigres do Brasil players
Duque de Caxias Futebol Clube players
Aalesunds FK players
Kongsvinger IL Toppfotball players
Boluspor footballers
Madureira Esporte Clube players
Campeonato Brasileiro Série D players
Eliteserien players
Norwegian First Division players
TFF First League players
Brazilian expatriate footballers
Expatriate footballers in Norway
Brazilian expatriate sportspeople in Norway
Expatriate footballers in Turkey
Brazilian expatriate sportspeople in Turkey